Ghozgarhy, or Ghoz Ghari, is an area of Upper Kurram, Kurram Agency, Federally Administered Tribal Areas, Pakistan. The population is 7,349 according to the 2017 census.

Ghozgarhy is located near the border of Pakistan with Paktia, Afghanistan.

History 

In November 2017, a US drone strike was carried out on a house in Ghozgarhy. This action was condemned by the Foreign Office. Four people were killed in this strike.

References 

Populated places in Kurram District